Cuthbert Storey (born 1878) was an English professional association footballer who played as an inside forward. He played four matches in the Football League for Burnley in the 1902–03 season, and scored one goal.

References

1878 births
Year of death unknown
Footballers from Burnley
English footballers
Association football forwards
Burnley F.C. players
English Football League players